was a Japanese artist, most known for her abstract paintings.

Early life and education

Yokoi was born in 1924 in Nagoya, Aichi, and soon after moved to Tsushima, Japan. In 1947, she painted portraits of several U.S. Army officers' wives, including Jean Barnett Alexander, the wife of Lt. John A. Alexander.  In the late 40s she studied with the Impressionist painter Takanori Kinoshita in Tokyo. After winning prizes in the Issuikai and Nitten Exhibitions between 1949 and 1951, she moved to the United States in 1953, and studied at the California School of Fine Arts (now San Francisco Art Institute). In New York she studied with Hans Hofmann, and with Julian Levi at the Art Students League. In New York her style shifted away from objective Impressionism, becoming increasingly abstract.

Career
As of 2010, Yokoi has held almost 80 solo exhibitions since 1954. She has held exhibitions at the California Palace of the Legion of Honor, the Seibu Art Forum, and the Galerie Kornfeld in Bern, among others. She has won prizes at the Philadelphia Annual Exhibition in 1957, the Washington Biennale, and the San Francisco annual art exhibition. In November 2004, the Teruko Yokoi Hinagashi Museum was founded in Ena, Gifu,  and in 2008, the Yokoi Teruko Fuji Museum of Art was founded in Fuji, Shizuoka.

In 2014, at 90, Yokoi created works for a benefit exhibition, with the proceeds from the paintings going to UNESCO Biosphere Entlebuch."

Personal life
Yokoi married the painter Sam Francis, with whom she had a daughter.

Yokoi died on 28 October 2020, aged 96.

Books
 Comme un petit coquelicot (1986)
 Die fünf Jahreszeiten. Les cinq saisons. The five seasons: Teruko Yokoi (1990)
 Teruko Yokoi - Schnee Mond Blumen (2009)
 Mond-Sonne Jahrezeiten (2010)
 70 years of artist life of Teruko Yokoi -Japanese Poems drawn in Switzerland (2015)

References

1924 births
2020 deaths
20th-century Japanese painters
21st-century Japanese painters
20th-century Japanese women artists
20th-century Japanese artists
21st-century Japanese women artists
21st-century Japanese artists
Abstract painters
Japanese women painters
Japanese expatriates in Switzerland
San Francisco Art Institute alumni
Art Students League of New York alumni